Westerville South High School is a public high school located in Westerville, Ohio, northeast of Columbus, Ohio. Originally Westerville High School, it is the oldest of the three high schools in the Westerville City School District. It serves most of southern Westerville, as well as much of the portion of Columbus served by Westerville City Schools.

History
Dedicated in 1960 as Westerville High School, it was renamed Westerville South High School in 1975 upon the opening of Westerville's second high school, Westerville North. 

The principal of Westerville South is Mike Hinze. School colors are red and white.  The school mascot is the Wildcat. Its CEEB code is 365430.

Notable alumni

Andy Katzenmoyer
Ki-Jana Carter- (Former #1 NFL Draft Pick)
Lance Moore
Nick Moore (Canadian football)
Traevon Jackson
John Mackey (composer)

Ohio High School Athletic Association state championships

 Girls Soccer – 1994,1995
 Boys Soccer – 1989
 Boys Basketball - 2016
 Cheerleading - 1998, 2000, 2001, 2002, 2003

Male sports 
 Baseball
 Basketball
 Cross country
 American football
 Lacrosse
 Soccer
 D1 State Champions (1989)
 Swimming & Diving 
 Tennis
 Track and Field
 Wrestling
 Bowling 
 OCC champions: (2010–11, 2011–12, 2013–14, 2014-15)

Female sports 

 Basketball
 2018 & 2019 OCC champions
 Cheerleading
 State champions (1998, 2000, 2001, 2002, 2003)
 Cross country
 Lacrosse
 Golf
 Soccer
 D1 State champions (1994, 1995)
 Softball 
 Swimming & diving
 Tennis
 Track and field
 Volleyball
 Bowling
 OCC champions: (2013–14, 2014–15, 2016–17)

Notes and references

External links
 District Website

High schools in Franklin County, Ohio
Public high schools in Ohio
International Baccalaureate schools in Ohio
Westerville, Ohio